Nikola Kalinić (born 8 November 1991) is a Serbian professional basketball player for FC Barcelona of the Spanish Liga ACB and the EuroLeague. He also represents the senior Serbian national basketball team internationally.

Professional career

Early years
Kalinić made his professional debut with his hometown team Spartak Subotica. In the 2010–11 season, he played with KK Novi Sad, and then from 2011 to 2013, he played with Vojvodina Srbijagas.

In July 2013, he signed a three-year contract with Radnički Kragujevac. Over 25 games played in the ABA League, he averaged 6.4 points and 4 rebounds per game.

Crvena zvezda
On July 21, 2014, Kalinić signed a three-year contract with Crvena zvezda. In his debut EuroLeague season, he averaged 9.2 points, 3.9 rebounds and 2 assists per game, over 24 games played. In his first season with the club, he won a triple crown, winning the Serbian League, Serbian Cup, and ABA League.

Fenerbahçe
On July 31, 2015, Crvena zvezda announced that Kalinić moved to Fenerbahçe, for a buyout amount of €1 million euros. On August 12, 2015, Fenerbahçe officially announced that Kalinić had signed a two-year contract, with the option of an additional year.

In his first season with the team, Kalinić won the Turkish Cup title, in a 67–65 win over Darüşşafaka. Fenerbahçe also reached the finals game of the 2016 Euroleague Final Four, but fell short of winning the EuroLeague championship, after an overtime 96–101 loss to CSKA Moscow. Over 29 EuroLeague games played that season, he averaged 4.6 points and 3.3 rebounds per game. At the end of the season, Fenerbahçe also won the Turkish League championship.

On July 7, 2017, Kalinić re-signed with Fenerbahçe for three more seasons. In the 2017–18 EuroLeague season, Fenerbahçe made it to the 2018 EuroLeague Final Four, the club's fourth consecutive Final Four appearance. Eventually, they lost to Real Madrid, by a score of 80–85 in the finals game. Over 19 EuroLeague games played that season, he averaged 5.5 points, 1.6 rebounds and 1.2 assists per game.

Valencia
On July 18, 2020, Kalinić officially moved to Spanish EuroLeague club Valencia on a one-year contract.

Return to Crvena zvezda
On July 15, 2021, Crvena zvezda announced that they had signed with Kalinić. On April 27, 2022, Kalinić was selected the 2021–22 ABA League MVP. The club won ABA League, Serbian League, and Serbian Cup in the 2021–22 season.

Barcelona
On July 12, 2022, Kalinić signed a two-year deal with FC Barcelona, after an agreement was also reached between Barcelona and Valencia concerning his Spanish league contract rights.

National team career

Kalinić represented the senior Serbia men's national basketball team at the EuroBasket 2013. He was also a member of the Serbian national basketball team that won the silver medal at the 2014 FIBA World Cup, under new head coach Aleksandar Đorđević.

He represented Serbia once again at the EuroBasket 2015. In the first phase of the tournament, Serbia dominated in the tournament's toughest group, Group B, with a 5–0 record, and then eliminated Finland and Czech Republic in the round of 16 and quarterfinal games, respectively. However, they were stopped in the semifinal game by Lithuania, by a score of 67–64, and eventually lost to the host team France, in the bronze-medal game, by a score of 81–68. Over 9 tournament games played, Kalinić averaged 5.8 points, 2.1 rebounds and 1.7 assists per game, on 69% shooting from the field and 33.3% shooting from the free-throw line.

Kalinić also represented Serbia at the 2016 Summer Olympics, where they won the silver medal, after losing to the United States in the final game, by a score of 96–66.

Career statistics

EuroLeague

|-
| style="text-align:left;"| 2014–15
| style="text-align:left;"| Crvena zvezda
| 24 || 10 || 26.0 || .429 || .355 || .627 || 3.9 || 2.0 || .8 || .2 || 9.2 || 9.1
|-
| style="text-align:left;"| 2015–16
| style="text-align:left;" rowspan=5| Fenerbahçe
| 29 || 13 || 18.9 || .434 || .242 || .711 || 3.3 || 1.2 || .4 || .2 || 4.6 || 5.4
|-
| style="text-align:left;background:#AFE6BA;"| 2016–17†
| 33 || 20 || 24.0 || .482 || .347 || .837 || 3.1 || 1.5 || .8 || .3 || 7.5 || 8.3
|-
| style="text-align:left;"| 2017–18
| 19 || 13 || 17.5 || .494 || .286 || .800 || 1.6 || 1.2 || .5 || .2 || 5.5 || 5.4
|-
| style="text-align:left;"| 2018–19
| 35 || 16 || 25.5 || .484 || .398 || .785 || 3.3 || 1.8 || .7 || .2 || 9.6 || 10.5
|-
| style="text-align:left;"| 2019–20
| 26 || 12 || 22.9 || .426 || .314 || .870 || 2.5 || 1.7 || .8 || .1 || 6.6 || 6.2
|-
| style="text-align:left;"| 2020–21
| style="text-align:left;"| Valencia
| 34 || 25 || 26.6 || .533 || .333 || .789 || 3.4 || 3.2 || .9 || .4 || 10.4 || 12.3
|-
| style="text-align:left;"| 2021–22
| style="text-align:left;"| Crvena zvezda
| 32 || 32 || 30.1 || .436 || .276 || .717 || 3.9 || 3.4 || 1.0 || .1 || 12.6 || 11.7
|- class="sortbottom"
| align="center" colspan="2"| Career
| 232 || 141 || 24.2 || .466 || .325 || .755 || 3.2 || 2.1 || .8 || .2 || 8.5 || 8.9

Domestic leagues

|-
| 2010–11 || rowspan="3" style="text-align:left;"| Vojvodina Srbijagas || rowspan="5"|KLS || 23 || 23.2 || .536 || .238 || .806 || 3.4 || .7 || 1.3 || .7 || 7.7
|-
| 2011–12 || 34 || 24.4 || .586 || .323 || .726 || 3.8 || 1.7 || 1.6 || .4 || 9.0
|-
| 2012–13 || 42 || 26.0 || .603 || .381 || .776 || 4.2 || 2.1 || 1.3 || .3 || 10.6
|-
| 2013–14 || style="text-align:left;"| Radnički Kragujevac || 24 || 22.6 || .429 || .300 || .740 || 3.8 || 1.4 || .9 || .3 || 6.4
|-
| rowspan="2"| 2014–15 || rowspan="2" style="text-align:left;" | Crvena zvezda || 18 || 23.1 || .577 || .358 || .627 || 3.9 || 1.9 || 1.5 || .3 || 9.9
|-
| Adriatic League || 34 || 22.8 || .618 || .382 || .718 || 4.1 || 1.5 || 1.0 || .6 || 10.1
|}

Personal life
Nikola is the son of former table tennis player Zoran Kalinić (born 1958), and Dragica (née Tošić), a former handball player. His older brother Uroš (b. 1986) is a water polo player for Montpellier, while his sister Mina also played handball. The children in the family all once played ping pong and went to tennis school.

Kalinić injured his chin during childhood, leaving a visibly deformed chin with surgery failing to fix it. He has said that he suffers no pain from it.

See also 
List of Olympic medalists in basketball

References

External links

 Nikola Kalinić at aba-liga.com
 
 Nikola Kalinić at EuroLeague.net
 
 Nikola Kalinić at TBLStat.net
 

1991 births
Living people
2014 FIBA Basketball World Cup players
ABA League players
Basketball League of Serbia players
Basketball players at the 2016 Summer Olympics
Competitors at the 2013 Mediterranean Games
FC Barcelona Bàsquet players
Fenerbahçe men's basketball players
KK Crvena zvezda players
KK Novi Sad players
KK Radnički Kragujevac (2009–2014) players
KK Spartak Subotica players
KK Vojvodina Srbijagas players
Liga ACB players
Medalists at the 2013 Summer Universiade
Medalists at the 2016 Summer Olympics
Mediterranean Games medalists in basketball
Mediterranean Games silver medalists for Serbia
Olympic basketball players of Serbia
Olympic medalists in basketball
Olympic silver medalists for Serbia
Power forwards (basketball)
Serbia men's national basketball team players
Serbian expatriate basketball people in Spain
Serbian expatriate basketball people in Turkey
Serbian men's basketball players
Small forwards
Sportspeople from Subotica
Universiade bronze medalists for Serbia
Universiade medalists in basketball
Valencia Basket players